Wickatunk is an unincorporated community located within Marlboro Township in Monmouth County, New Jersey, United States. It was founded in 1695 by three Scottish servants from the community of Toponemus (no longer in existence in Marlboro Township). Originally surveyed by George Keith, in a letter he states:  After the initial settlement, the plan in the early 1700s called for a village center with small town lots surrounded by plantations. However, that plan was not workable as it did not allow for townspeople to have farming land.

Research suggests the name derives from the Delaware (Algonquian) "wikwetung", meaning "the fishing place".

Farming and produce 

Known for the potato harvest from nearby farms, in 1923 the town hosted Representatives from "all the potato seed raising sections of the country" and Canada. In addition to the potatoes, the area was also well known for Stayman and Rome apples - winning state awards and registered Holstein Friesian cattle. Squab were also raised on farms in the area. The area was also known for manufacturing liquor and many area farms were raided for violations of the Volstead Act in the late 1920s and early 30s.

Transportation

Railroad 

A central feature of the community for years was the Wickatunk shipping point, part of a single track  railroad line from Matawan to Freehold, New Jersey. Having been included on the list of most dangerous railroad crossings by the Automobile Club of America in 1908 the station and crossing were demolished in the 1970s. The rail station was on tracks formally owned by the Central Railroad of New Jersey. Currently, the Henry Hudson Trail uses this right of way and passes through Wickatunk.

Roads and highways 

The major state road passing through the center of Wickatunk is Route 79. County Routes 3 and 520 also serve as major roads around Wickatunk.

Points of interest

Old Scots Burying Ground 
On the list of historic places, the town has a burial ground dating back to 1685. At that time the Presbyterians built the oldest Presbyterian church, starting with a crude structure of logs in 1692. By 1705 a refined church was reconstructed and by 1730 the congregation had grown and the church was removed to Freehold Township. Adjacent to the church was the Old Scots Burying Ground. The cemetery has at least 100 known graves. In 1895, seven hundred pilgrimages of the Presbyterian Synod came to the burial ground grave location of the first Pastor of the church (Rev. John Boyd) at Old Scots Cemetery to commemorate his life and the start of church at that location. A defining feature of the cemetery is the tall monument of Scottish and Vermont granite and Irish Graystone, surrounded by Scottish thistle carved in the granite With a  spire which was lost in the 1950s. The spire was refurbished in 2002. The monument was erected in memory of Rev. John Boyd, the first pastor of the church. In 1915, The Presbyterian Synod added John Tennent's name to the monument.

Robert Collier Estate 

In 1901, Robert J. Collier built his summer home in Wickatunk, bought from State Assemblyman John D. Honce. Used for many years as the location of personal parties and celebrations including the township Decoration Day celebrations, it was later donated and eventually became the Collier High School. Spanning many farms and properties, the area was also widely used for an annual fox hunt of the "Monmouth County Hounds" which started in East Freehold and ended at the Collier Estate.

General Store and Post Office 

In the late 1920s, a general store and post office was constructed on Route 79. Passing through many hands since then it is currently a bike store. The Post Office obtained some notoriety when the Post mistress, Sadie S. Smock died in February 1928. Her husband "carried on the business for over a year" before an issue developed which brought a postal inspector who discovered the situation. William T. Smock was later sentenced to 60 days in jail for embezzling postal funds.

Yellowstone Buffalo 

In the early 1900s, a buffalo brought from Yellowstone National Park by Richard W. Herbert was kept on his farm for all to see.

Marlboro Psychiatric Hospital 

Starting in 1928,  were eventually purchased by the State of New Jersey. Some of the land was in Wickatunk for the construction of Marlboro Psychiatric Hospital. The hospital's original working name was "Hillsdale asylum at Wickatunk". It was later known as "The Hilldale Development" before becoming known as "Marlboro Psychiatric Hospital".

References

Marlboro Township, New Jersey
Unincorporated communities in Monmouth County, New Jersey
Unincorporated communities in New Jersey
New Jersey placenames of Native American origin